Søren Lyng Christiansen (born 8 July 1966) is a Danish former professional football forward who won the 1993 Danish football championship with F.C. Copenhagen and made two international caps.

Honours
Club
Danish Championships: 1992-93 with F.C. Copenhagen

External links
Danish national team profile
 Boldklubben Frem profile

1966 births
Living people
Association football forwards
Danish men's footballers
Denmark international footballers
Boldklubben Frem players
F.C. Copenhagen players
Lyngby Boldklub players
Herfølge Boldklub players
People from Gentofte Municipality
Sportspeople from the Capital Region of Denmark